Nomi Talisman (born 1966) is an Israeli-born, American film director, producer, cinematographer and animator. She is best known for co-producing and co-directing short-documentary Last Day of Freedom for which she received Academy Award for Best Documentary (Short Subject) nomination at 88th Academy Awards, with Dee Hibbert-Jones. In April 2016, Hibbert-Jones and Talisman were awarded a Guggenheim Fellowship, and won an Emmy Award for Last Day of Freedom, at the 45th Annual Northern California Emmy Awards (News and Program Speciality - Documentary Topical). In 2019, Talisman and Hibbert-Jones were awarded a Creative Capital Award to work on their next feature-length animated documentary Run With It

Biography

Talisman was born in 1966 in Israel.

Filmography
 Last Day of Freedom (2015)

Awards and nominations
Nomi shared following awards and nominations with Hibbert-Jones: 
 2019 Creative Capital Award for Run With It, a feature-length animated doc (with Dee Hibbert-Jones)
2016 Fellow of the John Simon Guggenheim Memorial Foundation
 2016 California Public Defenders Association, Gideon Award (film), for Last Day of Freedom (with Dee Hibbert-Jones and Bill Babbitt)
 2016 Veterans Braintrust Award, Black Congressional Caucus, with Dee Hibbert-Jones, for Last Day of Freedom
 2016 The 45th Annual Northern California Area EMMY® Award , Documentary-Topical
 2015: Academy Awards nomination:
 Best Documentary - Short Subject
 2015: International Documentary Association 
 Best Short Documentary Award.
 2015: Full Frame Documentary Film Festival 
 Best Short Film - Jury Award
 Duke University, The Center for Documentary Studies Filmmaker Award
 2015: Hamptons International Film Festival 
 Golden Starfish Award - Best Documentary Short Film sponsored by ID Films.
Other Festivals (partial list):
 Tallgrass Film Festival – Golden Strands Award, Outstanding Documentary Short Film.8
 Dok Leipzig – International Competition Animated Documentary – Honorary Mention[9]
 Bar Harbor Film Festival – Best Animated Documentary Short[10]
 SF Doc Fest- Best Short Audience Award[11]
 (In)Justice For All Film Festival – Justice Impact Award
 Atlanta Docufest – Best Experimental Documentary Short[12]
 DC Independent Film Festival - Best Short Documentary [13]

References

External links
 
 Talisman and Jones official website
 

American animators
American animated film producers
American animated film directors
American women animators
Israeli animators
Israeli women animators
Israeli animated film directors
Israeli animated film producers
Israeli women film directors
Israeli women film producers
Artists from California
Living people
1966 births
American documentary film directors
American women documentary filmmakers
21st-century American women